The 28th Directors Guild of America Awards, honoring the outstanding directorial achievements in film and television in 1975, were presented in 1976.

Winners and nominees

Film

Television

Outstanding Television Director
 Sam O'Steen

References

External links
 

Directors Guild of America Awards
1975 film awards
1975 television awards
Direct
Direct
Directors